Stefano Napoleoni (born 26 June 1986) is an Italian professional footballer who plays as a forward for Serie D club Roma City FC.

Club career

Widzew Łódź
Napoleoni became the first ever Italian player to play in the Polish Ekstraklasa. Joining him later at Widzew Łódź was Joseph Dayo Oshadogan. He moved to Levadiakos after Widzew Łódź were relegated at the end of 2008.

Levadiakos
In January 2009 he signed for Greek club Levadiakos, after APOEL FC had withdrawn its interest in signing him player. Throughout the years, he became an idol for the fans of Levadiakos. In July 2012, six months before his contract with Levadiakos expired, Napoleoni was attracting interest from West Bromwich Albion. He left Levadiakos in December 2012 at the end of his contract. Overall, Napoleoni played 98 games, scored 28 goals and made 11 assists while at the club.

Atromitos F.C.
In January 2013 he signed for Greek club Atromitos F.C.

In April 2015, as his contract was soon to expire, he was gathering interest from AEK, Sassuolo and PAOK.

On 3 May 2015, Atromitos played against Panionios, which would decide whether Atromitos would enter the play-offs. Napoleoni scored his second career hat-trick and lead his team to a 3-1 victory, promoting his club to the Greek play-offs.
Being one of the most stable and most valuable players of Atromitos F.C. during the last seasons, he cashed his offer with a new four-year contract (2 + 2 years) which would have tied him with the club until mid-2019.

İstanbul Başakşehir
On 31 January 2016, Napoleoni signed a one-and-a-half year contract with Super Lig side İstanbul Başakşehir for a fee of €400,000.  He spoke to club's official website about his decision to continue his career in Turkey with İstanbul Başakşehir, after three years at the club: "I need more than a thousand words to describe my feelings right now, I am happy but also sad for leaving after three years, which I will never forget. I want to thanks my teammates, all the managers I worked with, the president Mr. Spanos, and the Technical Manager Mr. Angelopoulos and especially the fans who supported me during good and difficult times. I would have never made this career step without all of them, they helped me improve as player and as a person, so I am sure that in the future I will wear Atromitos' shirt again".

Göztepe
On 2 September 2019, Napoleoni moved to another Super Lig club Göztepe for an undisclosed fee, on a one-year deal (with an option of another year).

Ümraniyespor
On 7 September 2021, Napoleoni signed for TFF First League side Ümraniyespor.

Roma City
In November 2022, Napoleoni returned to his native Italy to join Serie D club Roma City.

Personal life
Napoleoni is an avid fan of A.S. Roma. In 2013, he said "I dream of playing in A.S. Roma with the phenomenon Francesco Totti. I was in the field against PAOK, I scored two goals and we won. In the locker room, my teammates told me the result of Roma - Lazio and for me it was a total massacre. If Rudi Garcia called me, I could go to Rome on foot."''

Career statistics

Honours
Widzew Łódź
 Polish First League (Second Division): 2008–09

Başakşehir
 Süper Lig Runners-up: 2016–17, 2018–19

References

External links
 
 
 

Living people
1986 births
Footballers from Rome
Association football forwards
Italian footballers
Widzew Łódź players
Ekstraklasa players
Levadiakos F.C. players
Atromitos F.C. players
İstanbul Başakşehir F.K. players
Göztepe S.K. footballers
Ümraniyespor footballers
A.S.D. Roma City F.C. players
Super League Greece players
Süper Lig players
TFF First League players
Italian expatriate footballers
Expatriate footballers in Greece
Expatriate footballers in Poland
Expatriate footballers in Turkey
Italian expatriate sportspeople in Greece
Italian expatriate sportspeople in Poland
Italian expatriate sportspeople in Turkey